The ZenFone 7 and ZenFone 7 Pro are Android-based smartphones manufactured, released and marketed by Asus. The phones were unveiled on 26 August 2020, and succeed the ZenFone 6.

Introduction 

On 26 August 2020, Asus launched the ZenFone 7 series in a Mandarin online press conference from their Taiwan headquarters. The ZenFone 7 series consists of the ZenFone 7 and ZenFone 7 Pro, retaining the hallmark flip-up camera form factor of the ZenFone 6 with the addition of a 3x telephoto camera, Sony IMX686 main sensor, 8K video recording capabilities, improved actuation mechanism, and optical image stabilisation exclusive to the Pro model. The ZenFone 7 series features a 6.67-inch 90 Hz AMOLED display with 200 Hz touch sampling and a 5G-capable Snapdragon 865 system on a chip, with the higher-clocked Snapdragon 865 Plus on the Pro model. Other changes include the removal of the headphone jack, ZenUI 7, 30W fast charging, combined side-mounted fingerprint scanner–power button–smart key, UFS 3.1 storage, three-microphone array utilising Nokia’s OZO Audio processing, and a larger and heavier overall form factor. The ZenFone 7 series will not be available in North America because of a lack of 5G  band support.

References

External links 

 

Android (operating system) devices
Mobile phones introduced in 2020
Mobile phones with multiple rear cameras
Mobile phones with 8K video recording
Asus ZenFone
Flagship smartphones